Ravindra Kaushik (11 April 1952 – November 2001) was a Research and Analysis Wing agent, who spied against Pakistan from 1975 to 1983.

Also named as The Black Tiger, he is considered as one of India's greatest spies.

He penetrated the Pakistan Army and reached till the rank of Major.

Early life
Ravindra Kaushik was born in Sri Ganganagar, Rajasthan on 11 April 1952 in a Brahmin family. His father, J. M. Kaushik, was an Indian Air Force officer; his mother Amla Devi died in 2006. He did his graduation from S. D. Bihani P. G. College, Sri Ganganagar, earning a B.Com and was involved with theatre acting while in college when he was recruited by the R&AW.

Recruitment in Research and Analysis Wing
Kaushik was trained in Delhi for two years to be an undercover Operative in Pakistan. He was also trained to live life as a Muslim and was taught Urdu language. Being from Sri Ganganagar, a city near Rajasthan's border with Punjab, he was well versed in Punjabi, which is widely understood in Punjab (India) and Pakistan as well. In 1975, at the age of 23, he was sent to Pakistan.

Activities in Pakistan
Kaushik converted to Islam, underwent circumcision and was given the cover name "Nabi Ahmed Shakir". After successfully getting admission in Karachi University, he completed his LL.B. After his graduation, joined Pakistan Army as a commissioned officer and was eventually promoted to the rank of major. He married a local girl named Amanat, the daughter of a tailor in one of the army units, and fathered a boy who died in 2012–2013.

From 1979 to 1983, Kaushik worked as a Pakistani army officer. As trained at R&AW, he was sending valuable information to R&AW which was of great help to India. He was given the title of 'Black Tiger' by the Prime Minister of India Indira Gandhi.

Death and aftermath
In September 1983, R&AW sent a low-level operative, Inyat Masih, to get in touch with Kaushik. But, Masih was exposed by Joint Counter-intelligence Bureau of Pakistan's Inter-Services Intelligence and blew Kaushik's cover. Kaushik was also captured, tortured for two years at an interrogation center in Sialkot. He was given the death sentence in 1985. His sentence was later commuted to a life term by the Supreme Court of Pakistan. He was kept in various jails in various cities, including Sialkot, Kot Lakhpat and in Mianwali jail for 16 years. He managed to secretly send letters to his family in India, which revealed his poor health condition and the trauma faced by him in Pakistani jails. In one of his letters, he wrote:

In November 2001, he succumbed to pulmonary tuberculosis and heart disease in Central Jail Mianwali in Pakistan.

According to Ravindra's family, Indian government had refused to recognise him and had made no effort to help him.

Ravindra's family claimed that the storyline of the famous Bollywood flick Ek Tha Tiger released in the year 2012 was based on the life of Ravindra and asked for credit in the movie titles for Ravindra. But the director Kabir Khan denied their claim. Romeo Akbar Walter, a 2019 Indian film written and directed by Robbie Grewal is loosely based on his activities in Pakistan, John Abraham plays the role of Ravindra Kaushik in the film, although the character is named Rehamatullah Khan.

See also
Sarabjit Singh
Kashmir Singh
Kulbhushan Jadhav
Research and Analysis Wing
Inter-services intelligence

Further reading

References 

Indian expatriates in Pakistan
1952 births
2001 deaths
India–Pakistan relations
Indian people imprisoned abroad
Indian people who died in prison custody
Indian spies
Pakistan Army officers
People of the Research and Analysis Wing
Prisoners and detainees of Pakistan
Prisoners who died in Pakistani detention
Punjabi people
University of Karachi alumni
Spies who died in prison custody
People convicted of espionage in Pakistan
Research and Analysis Wing activities in Pakistan
Tuberculosis deaths in Pakistan
21st-century deaths from tuberculosis
Infectious disease deaths in Punjab, Pakistan
Indian prisoners sentenced to death
Indian prisoners sentenced to life imprisonment
Prisoners sentenced to death by Pakistan
Prisoners sentenced to life imprisonment by Pakistan
Converts to Islam from Hinduism